Elections to the Mizoram Legislative Assembly were held in November 1993 to elect members of the 40 constituencies in Mizoram, India. The Indian National Congress won the most seats and its leader in Mizoram, Lal Thanhawla was appointed as the Chief Minister of Mizoram for the third time. Mizo National Front won the popular vote.

The term of the assembly formed after the previous election in 1989, was supposed to end in 1994, but the election was held ahead of schedule, owing to the Gospel Centenary celebrations, the centenary of the introduction of the gospel to the Mizo people.

Result

Elected Members

See also 
 List of constituencies of the Mizoram Legislative Assembly

References

Mizoram
1993
1993